Silver Studs was an Australian rock 'n' roll band formed in 1975 by Lance Reynolds, Keith Reed and Gino Latorre.

The group released one studio album which peaked at number 26 on the Australian charts in 1976.

The band renamed themselves as The Studs in 1977.

History
The Silver Studs originated in Brisbane in 1975. They signed to the Philips label and released the single "My Teenage Dream".

In February 1976, they supported The Hollies on their Australian tour and in May 1976, released their rendition of "Happy Days", the theme song to the US TV comedy of the same name. The song peaked at number 5 on the charts, which was followed by "Dance with a Dolly", which peaked at number 17 in September. The band's debut album Happy Days was released in September 1976 and peaked at number 26.

In 1977, the band, now a duo consisting of Reynolds and Latorre renamed themselves The Studs.

The first single was "Funky Feet", written by ABBA’s Benny Anderson and Bjorn Ulvaeus, in June 1977 which peaked at number 20. The duo completed an album which was released in 1978.

Discography

Albums

Singles

References

Pop music duos
Rock music duos
Australian pop music groups
Musical groups established in 1975
Musical groups disestablished in 1978
Australian musical duos